Chayam may refer to:

Chayam (1973 film), a Malayalam film starring Sudheer and Sheela
Chayam (2004 film), a Malayalam film starring Manoj K Jayan and Shana Basu